{{Infobox television station
| callsign = WFTC
| city = Minneapolis, Minnesota
| logo = WFTC 2017 Logo.svg
| logo_size = 200px
| branding = Fox 9 Plus
| digital = 29 (UHF)
| virtual = 9.2
| subchannels = 
| translators = See 
| affiliations = {{ubl|9.1: Fox|9.2: MyNetworkTV|for more, see }}
| airdate = 
| location = Minneapolis–Saint Paul, Minnesota
| country = United States
| callsign_meaning = "Fox Twin Cities"
| former_callsigns = 
| former_channel_numbers = 
| owner = Fox Television Stations, LLC
| sister_stations = KMSP-TV
| former_affiliations = 
| erp = 1,000 kW
| haat = 
| facility_id = 11913
| coordinates = 
| licensing_authority = FCC
| website = 
| embed_header = Satellite of WFTC
| embedded = 
}}

WFTC (channel 9.2) is a television station licensed to Minneapolis, Minnesota, United States, broadcasting the MyNetworkTV programming service to the Twin Cities area. It is owned and operated by Fox Television Stations alongside Fox outlet KMSP-TV (channel 9). Both stations share studios on Viking Drive in Eden Prairie, while WFTC's transmitter is located in Shoreview, Minnesota.

WFTC rebroadcasts its signal on full-power satellite station KFTC (channel 26) in Bemidji (with transmitter near Lake Bemidji State Park) and several low-power repeaters across Minnesota, including the Mankato market (via K23MF-D in nearby St. James through the local municipal-operated Cooperative TV (CTV) network of translatorsCTV Channel Listing via the Cooperative TV (CTV) Website), as that area does not have a MyNetworkTV affiliate of its own.

History

Early history
The station signed on air in October 1982 as WFBT (for "Family Bible Television"). Channel 29 originally maintained a schedule offering reruns of classic family-oriented series and Christian-based religious programming. The station was started by a group led by Danny Koker, a gospel musician and father of Danny Koker II, star of History's Counting Cars. It first operated from studio facilities located on Aspen Lane North in Brooklyn Park, Minnesota. On May 6, 1984, the station was sold to the Beverly Hills Hotel Corporation, headed by prominent arbitrageur Ivan Boesky, who changed its call letters to KITN-TV (which although it actually stood for "Independent Twenty-Nine", colloquially meant "Kitten" as in, "The KITN That Roars!"). At that time, it transitioned into the market's second mainstream independent station (and first on the UHF dial), airing syndicated programs such as The Beverly Hillbillies, Batman and Star Trek: The Original Series. It also acquired broadcast rights to the NHL's Minnesota North Stars, as well as University of Minnesota college football games. In 1985, BHHC sold the station to Nationwide Communications, the broadcasting subsidiary of Columbus, Ohio–based Nationwide Insurance.

As a Fox affiliate, then becoming a UPN station
In 1988, KMSP-TV ended its affiliation with Fox, disappointed with the network's weak programming offerings that were bogging down the station's otherwise successful general entertainment lineup. Fox then shifted its affiliation to KITN, which adopted the moniker "Fox 29". The station again changed its call sign to WFTC on October 1, 1994 (for "We're Fox Twin Cities"), with the additional change using the "W" first-letter identifier over the "K", allowed for by its transmitter location on the eastern side of the Mississippi River. The station later relocated its operations to a new studio located on Broadway Street Northeast in Minneapolis. 

Until 1998, it served as the de facto Fox affiliate for almost all of Minnesota; the state's other two markets, Duluth and Rochester, did not have Fox affiliates of their own until KXLT-TV signed on in Rochester in 1998, and KQDS-TV debuted in Duluth one year later. Most areas in western Minnesota received Fox programming from Fargo, North Dakota's KVRR or Sioux Falls, South Dakota's KTTW.

As part of its liquidation of its broadcasting interests, Nationwide Communications sold the station to Clear Channel Communications (now iHeartMedia) in 1993 (it was the last remaining television station under Nationwide's ownership, the company having sold its other three stations, all of which were affiliated with ABC, to Young Broadcasting the year before). In 2001, Clear Channel traded the station to Fox Television Stations for KMOL-TV (now WOAI-TV) in San Antonio and KTVX in Salt Lake City. Both stations were acquired by Fox through its purchase of Chris-Craft Industries' broadcast properties, which included then-UPN affiliate KMSP-TV. WFTC became the third station in the area to be owned-and-operated by a major network, but since KMSP had higher ratings and a stronger signal than WFTC, Fox switched the affiliations of the two stations on September 8, 2002: Fox programming returned to KMSP, while WFTC affiliated with UPN.

Switch to MyNetworkTV

On January 24, 2006, CBS Corporation and Time Warner announced that UPN and The WB would shut down and be replaced by a new network that would carry programs from both networks, The CW.UPN and WB to Combine, Forming New TV Network, The New York Times, January 24, 2006. Despite affiliating with most of CBS Corporation's UPN stations and Tribune Broadcasting's WB stations, Fox's UPN affiliates were not included in the new network. Although The CW did not sign its Twin Cities' affiliate until May 2006 (when KMWB-TV (which changed its calls to WUCW by the network's launch in September) was announced as the network's local affiliate-through an affiliation deal by its parent, Sinclair Broadcast Group), WFTC joined other Fox-owned UPN stations in scrubbing all UPN branding the following day, becoming branded as simply "WFTC 29". It also stopped promoting UPN programming outside of network hours. On February 22, less than a month after the announcement of The CW, Fox announced that it would (in conjunction with its syndication division Twentieth Television) launch a new network called MyNetworkTV, with WFTC and the other Fox-owned UPN stations (plus included in this deal is a Fox-owned independent station in Dallas-Fort Worth) as the nuclei. On June 2, 2006, WFTC officially changed its branding to "My 29", following its impending switch to the newly launched Fox-owned network.

Although MyNetworkTV announced its launch date to be September 5, UPN continued to broadcast on stations across the country until September 15, 2006. While some UPN affiliates that switched to MyNetworkTV aired the final two weeks of UPN's programming outside its regular primetime slot, the Fox-owned stations (including WFTC) dropped the network entirely on August 31, 2006. On September 9, 2006, WFTC began carrying the 4Kids TV lineup for the first time since 2002, when the station was a Fox affiliate airing what was then Fox Kids. The station continues to air the Weekend Marketplace infomercial block on Saturday mornings while sister station KMSP aired Xploration Station which started in the fall of 2014.

Programming
Syndicated programming
Syndicated programs seen on WFTC include The Simpsons (which aired first-run on the station prior to its 2002 affiliation swap with KMSP), 25 Words or Less, The Big Bang Theory, Modern Family, and Schitt's Creek'', among others.

Sports programming
Upon the team's founding in 1989, the station acquired the broadcast rights to the Minnesota Timberwolves, carrying a select number of games along with KSTP-TV (channel 5) as well as NBC affiliate KARE (channel 11). The team's relationship with the station would end after the 1993–94 season, when the team's over-the-air broadcasts moved to KLGT-TV (channel 23, now CW affiliate WUCW).  With the Fox network gaining rights to NFL games (NFC games, and with it, Minnesota Vikings games) in the 1994 season, channel 29 succeeded WCCO-TV as the unofficial home station of the team. It would hold this role until the end of the 2001 season (since 2002, most games are broadcast on KMSP-TV).

News operation
Clear Channel started a news department for the station shortly before selling the station to Fox. As a Fox affiliate, WFTC launched an hour-long primetime newscast at 9:00 p.m. on April 23, 2001, where it faced competition from KMSP's established hour-long news program. After Fox assumed control of the station, the station's news department was integrated with that of KMSP, and its late newscast was moved to 10 p.m. and shortened to 30 minutes. Though this move protected new sister station KMSP, WFTC now faced stiff competition from late evening newscasts on KARE, KSTP-TV and WCCO-TV. Channel 29's 10 p.m. newscast was eventually canceled due to low ratings, airing its final edition on June 30, 2006; the timeslot was then replaced by syndicated programming. The 10 p.m. news program was then moved to KMSP as part of an expanded late news block. Some members of WFTC's on-air staff were retained by KMSP's news department.

In February 2022, WFTC began simulcast programming from Fox Weather. This programming airs from 10 to 11 a.m. on weekdays, and from 8 to 10 a.m. on Saturdays.

Technical information

Subchannels
The digital signal of KMSP-TV contains six subchannels, while WFTC's signal contains four. Through the use of virtual channels, WFTC's subchannels are associated with channel 9.

In November 2009, a standard definition simulcast of KMSP was added to WFTC's second subchannel and given a virtual channel number of 9.2. In turn, a standard definition simulcast of WFTC was placed on KMSP's second subchannel and given a virtual channel number of 29.2. This ensures reception of both stations even in cases where the ATSC channel on which KMSP or WFTC operates is not actually receivable.

On August 27, 2012, WFTC began carrying programming from Bounce TV on a new digital subchannel on 29.3, as part of an affiliation deal between the network and Fox Television Stations' MyNetworkTV O&Os.

On June 19, 2014, KMSP-TV announced plans that, effective June 24, 2014, they would broadcast their 9.1 virtual channel via RF channel 29 to take advantage of its broader coverage area and allow viewers with UHF-only antennas to receive the station in high definition. KMSP and WFTC unified all of their over-the-air channels as virtual subchannels of KMSP. As a result, the PSIPs of WFTC changed to channel 9. KMSP also continues to broadcast on RF 9 (VHF), mapping to 9.9.

Analog-to-digital conversion
On February 5, 2009, WFTC's Bemidji-based satellite station KFTC began broadcasting its signal in digital only. WFTC shut down its analog signal, over UHF channel 29, on June 12, 2009, the official date in which full-power television stations in the United States transitioned from analog to digital broadcasts under federal mandate. The station's digital signal relocated from its pre-transition UHF channel 21 to former UHF analog channel 29 for post-transition operations, while KFTC (which did not receive a companion digital channel prior to the digital transition) flash-cut to digital on its former analog channel assignment of UHF channel 26.

Translators
In addition to the main transmitter in Shoreview and full-power KFTC-DT1 in Bemidji, KMSP's signal is relayed to outlying parts of Minnesota through a network of translators.

The following translators rebroadcast WFTC:
 Alexandria: K30AF-D
 Frost: K29IF-D
 Jackson: K34NU-D
 Olivia: K34OZ-D
 Redwood Falls: K19CV-D
 St. James: K23MF-D
 Walker: K21HX-D
 Willmar: K30FZ-D

The following translators rebroadcast KMSP-TV:
 Alexandria: K32EB-D
 Frost: K19LJ-D
 Jackson: K31NT-D
 St. James: K16CG-D
 Walker: K21HX-D
 Willmar: K36OL-D

The following translators rebroadcast KFTC:
 Brainerd: K20NH-D
 Red Lake: K34NP-D

References

NorthPine.com: Minnesota TV Translators and Satellite Stations

External links
FOX9.com - KMSP-TV/WFTC-TV official website
 RabbitEars.info website - WFTC
 RabbitEars.info website - KFTC
 WFTC video clip from September 11, 2001

Television stations in Minneapolis–Saint Paul
Fox Television Stations
MyNetworkTV affiliates
Movies! affiliates
Television channels and stations established in 1982
Nationwide Communications
1982 establishments in Minnesota